Animal Lover is an album by American art rock band the Residents. Released in 2005, it is a concept album about the interaction between human beings, industry, and nature, Animal Lover was released to relative critical acclaim and remains a fan favorite.

Track listing

Bonus CD
The album also contains a bonus CD, generally called "...Imaginary Jack". According to the Cryptic Corporation, it really is one long track, divided to six parts to the enjoyment of the listener. The full title is actually the entire text written on the disc:

"I stood at my window staring at an arcing streetlight.
A sudden wind made me pull my shoulders to my ears.
I pissed into the dark.
It smelled like canned tuna.
My swollen lip throbbed.
I could still taste the blood.
My eyes rolled back looking for memories.
I stopped.

I was changing details in my mind, remembering only what I wanted it to be, not what it was.
I had only a short time to do what had to be done, after that it would all be forever absorbed by my imaginary Jack."

The tracks on the bonus CD combine elements from tracks from the original CD with elements from unreleased material, including early sketches and outtakes. For example, Track 2 samples earlier sketches of "My Window" and "Burn My Bones," Track 5 samples an instrumental later released as "Animal Lover Seven," and track 6 samples both "Jack's Lament" and a separately-recorded sketch for a vocal version.

Track listing
"Part 1" - 2:55
"Part 2" - 6:52
"Part 3" - 1:38
"Part 4" - 1:22
"Part 5" - 6:28
"Part 6" - 10:10

Animal Lover Instrumental
A CD containing a series of lush instrumental organizations was released in January 2008. It was limited to 1000 copies and sold very quickly.

Track listing
"Low Rain" - 2:11
"Dead Men" - 3:28
"On the Way (to Oklahoma)" - 2:12
"Olive and Gray" - 2:30
"What Have My Chickens Done Now?" - 2:48
"Two Lips" - 3:33
"Jack’s Lament" - 2:18
"Inner Space" - 3:08
"My Window" - 2:07
"Ingrid’s Oily Tongue" - 3:25
"Mother No More" - 3:00
"Aura Flex" - 3:31
"Elmer’s Song" - 6:00
"Monkey Man" - 5:01
"The Whispering Boy" - 3:09
"Burn My Bones" - 5:04

Trivia
'My Window' is a common encore song, starting with The Residents' 'The Bunny Boy' tour.

References

External links
Concerning the speed of Animal Lover Instrumental sales
Concerning the track listing of Animal Lover and its instrumental counterpart.

The Residents albums
2005 albums
Mute Records albums